Suntikoppa is one of the village panchayats(equalent of the word Town in English) of Kushalanagar Taluk,Kodagu district, Karnataka state, India.

Location
The geographical coordinates of Suntikopa are 12° 28' 0" North, 75° 50' 0" East. It is a town between Madikeri and Kushalnagar on the Mangalore-Mysore-Bangalore National highway SH88.

Suburbs and villages
The main localities of Suntikoppa are Pump House, Aparanda Extension, 1st Block, Maduramma Extension, Ulugulli Extension, Rama Extension, Guddappa Extension and Gaddehalla. Nearest Villages are KodagaraHalli, Kambibaane, 7th Hosakote, Naakoor, Garagandoor, Kedakkal, Kadlemane etc.

Education
Saint Antony's Kannada Medium School",St Mary's English Medium School and PU College and Govt Primary and High School and Govt Pre University College are the educational institutes in Suntikoppa village Panchayat/town.  Apart from these there are few other schools nearby which come under the township like Shanthinikethan School, Naada High School Kodagarahalli etc. There's also a special school run by the Tata Coffee Pvt.Limited called "Swastha" for the Specially Challenged Children.

Places of worship
Temples: Sri Rama Mandira, Aiyappa Temple, Muthappa Temple, Sri Chamundeshwari temple 
Churches: St Antony's Church.
Mosques: Suntikoppa hanafi masjid, Suntikoppa Shafi masjid and Salafi masjid.

Festivals
Suntikoppa is a very peaceful place and people from all religion, caste and creed live in harmony. Religious festivals like Ayudha Pooja, Diwali, Christmas, Muthappa temple feast, St Antony's Church Feast are celebrated in great grandeur.  Aayudha Pooja,  Muthappa Temple Feast and Republic Day are the major attractions in which thousands of people gather from around the State.
   
Main economic activities of the residents Suntikoppa town is growing Coffee, pepper and ginger and their dealerships, Kerala themed hotels and hardware sales.
Sports in Suntikoppa is quite popular from the days of the British Raj especially Football is highly promoted by the locals,a national football championship is held under the aegis of Blue Boys Club(formerly Suntikoppa Youth Club established by plantation staff of North Coorg in 1950)

See also

 Bylakuppe
 Kaveri Nisargadhama
 Dubare Elephant camp
 Kushalanagar

Post office
The Pin Code for Suntikoppa is 571237, telephone area code is 08276

Cities and towns in Kodagu district